Félix François Taymans (born 28 February 1886, date of death unknown) was a Belgian rower. He competed at the 1920 Summer Olympics in Antwerp with the men's eight where they were eliminated in round one.

References

1886 births
Year of death missing
Belgian male rowers
Olympic rowers of Belgium
Rowers at the 1920 Summer Olympics
European Rowing Championships medalists